Chess Monthly may refer to:

 The Chess Monthly (American magazine), New York, edited by Daniel Willard Fiske & Paul Morphy; published from 1857-1861. This is often referred to as American Chess Monthly despite there being a periodical of that name.
 The Chess Monthly (British magazine), London, edited by Leopold Hoffer & Johannes Zukertort, published from 1879-1896.
 American Chess Monthly (March 1892 – Sept/Oct 1893), Boston, edited by George H. Walcott, Jr.
 Brentano's Chess Monthly (May 1881 - June/Sept. 1882), New York, Allen et al.
 Maxwell Macmillan Chess Monthly (1991), continues Pergamon Chess and CHESS magazine
 Chess Monthly (1992), Wheatley, England, continues Maxwell Macmillan Chess Monthly (see below)